Grahame Francis "Spike" Cheney (born 27 April 1969) is a retired Australian boxer, who won a light welterweight (63.5 kg) silver medal at the 1988 Summer Olympics.

Cheney also won a bronze medal in the welterweight (67 kg) division at the 1990 Commonwealth Games.

Olympic results
1st round bye
Defeated Miguel González (Paraguay) RSC 2
Defeated Ike Quartey (Ghana) 5-0
Defeated Todd Foster (United States) 3-2
Defeated Lars Myrberg (Sweden) 5-0
Lost to Vyacheslav Yanovski (Soviet Union) 0-5

Pro career
Cheney turned pro in 1991, winning the WBC International Welterweight title. He retired in 1996 with a professional record of 17-3-0.

Personal life
Since 1998, Cheney has suffered from bipolar disorder.

References

External links
 
 
 
 
 

1969 births
Living people
Australian male boxers
Light-welterweight boxers
Olympic boxers of Australia
Olympic medalists in boxing
Olympic silver medalists for Australia
Boxers at the 1988 Summer Olympics
Medalists at the 1988 Summer Olympics
Commonwealth Games medallists in boxing
Commonwealth Games bronze medallists for Australia
Boxers at the 1990 Commonwealth Games
Medallists at the 1990 Commonwealth Games